The China State Shipbuilding Corporation (CSSC) is a Chinese shipbuilding conglomerate.

Description
CSSC is one of the top 10 defence groups in China. It consists of various shipyards, equipment manufacturers, research institutes and shipbuilding-related companies that build both civilian and military ships. It owns some of the most well known shipbuilders in China, such as Dalian Shipbuilding Industry Company, Jiangnan Shipyard, Hudong–Zhonghua Shipbuilding, Guangzhou Huangpu Shipbuilding and Guangzhou Wenchong Shipyard. Its subsidiary, China CSSC Holdings Limited, is listed on the Shanghai Stock Exchange, and in turn owns other subsidiaries including Shanghai Waigaoqiao Shipbuilding. As of 2022, CSSC builds around 41 percent of all ships. All CSSC ships are built to military specifications, according to Chinese government doctrine.

History

Early developments
In 1964, the Sixth Ministry of Machine Building was created to oversee China's shipbuilding enterprises, which were predominantly engaged in military work. In July 1982, as part of defence industry reforms and "defence conversions", the ministry was converted into the China State Shipbuilding Corporation. CSSC remained under state control but was permitted to operate with "a degree of market-based economic autonomy". CSSC shifted the industry's focus to commercial work; by 1992, 80% of output was to the civilian sector, and in 1993 half of the commercial output was for export.

Spinning off CSIC
In the late 1990s, economic reforms broke up state-owned monopolies and introduced "a limited amount of free-market competition" to improve the efficiency of defence industries. In July 1999, the China Shipbuilding Industry Corporation (CSIC) was spun off from CSSC. The shipbuilding industry was divided roughly along geographical lines: CSSC retained assets in the east and south, and CSIC gained control in the northeast and inland. Both reported to the State-owned Assets Supervision and Administration Commission (SASAC). CSSC emerged as the smaller entity. Enterprises not affiliated with either conglomerate included shipyards owned by the People's Liberation Army (PLA), provinces, municipalities, foreign joint ventures, and Chinese shipping companies.

Merging with CSIC
Preparations for merging CSIC and CSSC date back to at least 2010, when Hu Wenming became CSSC's party secretary, in anticipation of an industry decline. Hu was a strong supporter of the merger; he was CSSC chairman from 2012 to 2015, and then CSIC chairman from March 2015 until his retirement in August 2019 because of corruption. The decision to merge the conglomerates may have influenced not only by a slowing economy, but also the discovery of widespread corruption in CSIC and Hu's involvement in it.

The CSIC and CSSC merger was approved by SASAC in October 2019, and occurred in November 2019; the combined entity took the CSSC name. The reorganization was complete by September 2020. The new entity was the world's largest shipbuilder with 20% global market share and  billion in assets.

U.S. sanctions

In November 2020, American entities were prohibited by U.S. Presidential Executive Order 13959 from owning shares in companies—including CSSC—linked to the PLA by the United States Department of Defense.

See also
Hu Chuanzhi, former CEO of the CSSC
List of largest shipyards

References

Citations

Sources

External links

Vehicle manufacturing companies established in 1999
Government-owned companies of China
Shipbuilding companies of China
Chinese brands
Defence companies of the People's Republic of China
Chinese companies established in 1999